Just the 2 of Us is a singing Greek talent show based on the original Britain concept Just the Two of Us. The show aired on Mega Channel on 2010 and 2014, on 2020 was aired on Open TV and since 2021 is airing on Alpha TV.

The Greek version of the show consists of five seasons. The first aired from October 17, 2010 until January 16, 2011, and the second from April 2, 2014 until June 18, 2014. The third season of the show premiered on March 14, 2020. In June 2020, the show was renewed for a fourth season, with the premiere scheduled for October 10, 2020 from the TV station Open TV, with the same presenter and the same judges. The fifth season premiered on September 25, 2021 on Alpha TV, the presenter and the judges, from the previous season, returned.

Format
In every circle branded by the artistic, athletic or even television scene, they duet with a renowned professional singer and prepare a live song every week. The duets are rated by the jury from 1 to 10 for their performance, while still receiving positive votes from the television audience throughout the episode. Each week, the lowest-rated couple leaves the game.

Cast
The first season of the show was presented by Giorgos Kapoutzidis, while the second season was presented by Zeta Makripoulia. Since the third season, Nikos Koklonis hosts the show.

In the backstage, Doukissa Nomikou was in the first season, Dimitris Ouggarezos in the second season, the third season Vicky Kavoura and in the fourth season Laura Karaiskou. Since the fifth season Katerina Stikoudi is the backstage host. In the fifth season, Katerina Kainourgiou replaced Stikoudi in the fourth and fifth episodes, because of her pregnancy.

Stefanos Korkolis, Kostas Tournas, Athinais Nega and Lydia Papaioannou were the judges of the first season.

In the second season, the jury consisted of Giorgos Theofanous, Roula Koromila, Dimitris Arvanitis and Krateros Katsoulis. Director Dimitris Arvanitis stepped down from the show's jury after the 6th live due to the filming of the then-upcoming daily series, Dikaiosi. Actor Krateros Katsoulis took his place from the 7th to the last live show of the show.

Since the third season the panel jury consists of singer Despina Vandi, director and stage producer Stamatis Fasoulis and actress Vicky Stavropoulou. From season three until season five presenter Maria Bakodimou was in the jury. In the sixth season singer Katy Garbi, replaced Bakodimou.

Series overview

Season 1 (2010-2011)
The first season premiered on October 17, 2010 on Mega Channel. There were 12 couples, 6 boys contestant and 6 girls contestant.

The last show was aired on January 16, 2011 and the couple winners were Panagiotis Petrakis and Eleni Foureira.

Couples

Season 2 (2014)
The second season premiered on April 2, 2014 on Mega Channel. There were 12 couples, 6 boys contestant and 6 girls contestant.

The last show was aired on June 18, 2014 and the couple winners were Muriella Courenti and Giorgos Papadopoulos.

Couples

Season 3 (2020)

The third season premiered on March 14, 2020 on Open TV. There were 14 couples, 8 boys contestant and 6 girls contestant.

The last show was aired on July 11, 2020 and the couple winners were Tasos Xiarchos and Connie Metaxa.

Couples

Season 4 (2020)

The fourth season premiered on October 17, 2020 on Open TV.

Couples

Season 5 (2021-2022)

The fifth season premiered on September 25, 2021 on Alpha TV. There were 14 couples, 8 girls contestant and 6 boys contestant.

Couples

Season 6 (2022)
The sixth season premiered on October 8, 2022 on Alpha TV.

Couples

References

Mega Channel original programming
Open TV original programming
2010 Greek television series debuts
2011 Greek television series endings
2014 Greek television series debuts
2014 Greek television series endings
2020 Greek television series debuts
2010s Greek television series
2020s Greek television series
Greek reality television series
Greek television series based on British television series